The Social Amelioration and Genuine Intervention on Poverty (SAGIP), also known as the SAGIP Partylist,  is a political organization with party-list representation in the House of Representatives of the Philippines.

Background
The Social Amelioration and Genuine Intervention on Poverty (SAGIP) organization was initially established as 1-SAGIP (The "1" was latter dropped). It was approved as a partylist organization by the Commission on Elections to represent the urban poor sector. It took part in the 2013 elections with retired teacher and book distributor Erlinda Santiago as its first nominee. The group also had the endorsement of the Iglesia ni Cristo at least for that particular campaign. 1-SAGIP managed to secure a seat in the House of Representatives.

For the 2016 elections, SAGIP changed their first nominee to Rodante Marcoleta, a former representative of the Alagad partylist and a lawyer. SAGIP managed to retain their single seat in the 2016 and 2019 elections. It won an additional seat in the 2022 elections.

Electoral performance

Representatives to Congress

References

Party-lists represented in the House of Representatives of the Philippines